Özgürgün cabinet was the government of Northern Cyprus between 16 April 2016 and 2 February 2018. It replaced the Kalyoncu cabinet and consisted of 10 ministers formed by a coalition of the National Unity Party (UBP) and Democratic Party (DP-UG). The two parties shared the ministries 7 per 3.

References 

Cabinets of Northern Cyprus